A Film Unfinished (Hebrew title: שתיקת הארכיון Shtikat haArkhion, German title: Geheimsache Ghettofilm) is a 2010 documentary film by Yael Hersonski.

Summary 
The film re-examines the making of an unfinished 1942 German propaganda film (titled Das Ghetto, "The Ghetto") depicting the Warsaw Ghetto two months before the mass extermination of its inhabitants in the German operation known as the Grossaktion Warsaw. The documentary features interviews with surviving ghetto residents and a re-enactment of testimony from Willy Wist, one of the camera operators who filmed scenes for Das Ghetto.

Release 
It premiered at the 2010 Sundance Film Festival, where it won the "World Cinema Documentary Editing Award". At the Hot Docs festival in Toronto, the film won the Best International Feature award. The film was released theatrically in the US on 18 August 2010.

The film's distributor, Oscilloscope, appealed to the MPAA over the film's R rating but was unsuccessful in reclassifying the film. Oscilloscope says that the R rating is inconsistent with cultural norms because the U.S. Holocaust Memorial Museum, which is visited by school children, has more graphic footage.

Reception 
On Rotten Tomatoes the documentary has an approval rating of 97% based on reviews from 65 critics. The site's consensus states "A heartbreaking, haunting historical document, A Film Unfinished excavates particularly horrible chapter of Holocaust history, and in doing so, the film provides a glimpse into the Nazi propaganda machine." On Metacritic it has a score of 88% based on reviews from 19 critics, indicating "universal acclaim".

References

External links 
 
 A film Unfinished at World War 2 Films
 A Film Unfinished site for Independent Lens on PBS
 A Film Unfinished official web site 
 Das Ghetto the original German propaganda film

2010 films
2010 documentary films
Documentary films about films
Documentary films about the Holocaust
German independent films
Israeli documentary films
Works about Warsaw Ghetto
Israeli independent films
Documentary films about unfinished films
2010 independent films
2010s German films